Notable people with the surname Cacace include:

 Flavia Cacace, an Italian born British professional dancer
 Joel Cacace, a New York City mobster
 Liberato Cacace, a New Zealand professional footballer